Carol Jenkins was an African-American woman who was murdered on September 16, 1968, by two white men in a sundown town in Indiana. Her murder remained unsolved for over thirty years until a tip led investigators to one of her alleged killers in the early 2000s. Her alleged killer, Kenneth Clay Richmond, who was affiliated with the Ku Klux Klan, was declared incompetent to stand trial and died of bladder cancer in 2002. His accomplice was never identified.

Early life
Carol Jenkins was born to Elizabeth Jenkins in Franklin, Indiana in 1947. Her mother divorced her father when Carol was still an infant. Elizabeth would later marry Paul Davis, a local factory worker in nearby Rushville.

Paul raised Carol as his own, while he and Elizabeth would go on to have five more children, all of whom looked up to Carol as their big sister.

As a teenager, Carol wanted to move to Chicago and become a model. In 1965, shortly after graduating from Rushville High School, she got a job at the plant of the Philco Division of the Ford Motor Company. Carol worked there until a union strike temporarily shut the plant down. Looking to supplement her income, she took a job as a door-to-door saleswoman for Collier's, selling encyclopedias.

Murder
In September 1968, 20-year-old Carol—dressed in a white cotton turtleneck, a pair of olive-green wool pants, a brown jacket, and a bright yellow scarf—embarked on her first day of selling encyclopedias door-to-door. To impress her boss, she volunteered to go to Martinsville, Indiana. Martinsville was known to be a sundown town, yet Carol thought she would be safe that evening, as she would be traveling there with three co-workers—two white men and a 19-year-old black woman.

While on her route, two white men in a car began following her, cat-calling at her and hurling racist slurs. She approached the home of a young white married couple, Don and Norma Neal, seeking help, asking them, "Please let me in. I've got somebody following me."

The Neals called police out to their residence. The police reported that they tracked down two locals who admitted following her, but admitted to nothing else.

Norma Neal walked several blocks with Carol, looking for her co-workers. When they could not find them, Neal offered to let Carol stay at their residence. Carol turned down the offer, saying that she did not want to trouble them further. Around 8:30 P.M., Carol then walked off, heading to the predetermined rendezvous point where she was supposed to meet her co-workers to head back to Rushville.

Approximately 15 to 30 minutes later, two men got out of their car and chased her down. Her arms were held back from behind by one man, while the other man stabbed her with a screwdriver in her heart. The men left her in the street where, bleeding out from the wound, she died.

Carol's father insisted that, due to the racist past of Martinsville, the police should bring in the FBI to help investigate, but the police refused. Davis would later say, "I felt that because she was a black girl, nobody did anything."

Arrest
In June 2000, Carol's mother, Elizabeth, received an anonymous phone call from someone revealing the name of the killer. Elizabeth told Paul, who dipped into his retirement savings to hire a private investigator to look into it. After the Indiana State Police got wind of Paul's effort, they assigned two cold case investigators to look back into the murder. In November 2001, the investigators received an anonymous letter naming the killer—Kenneth Clay Richmond. The letter also said that Richmond's daughter, Shirley, had witnessed the murder.

For more than 33 years, the murder of Jenkins remained unsolved. On May 8, 2002, police arrested Kenneth C. Richmond in an Indianapolis nursing home. Upon his arrest, Richmond was found to be a 70-year-old career criminal with a history of bizarre behavior and affiliation with groups such as the Ku Klux Klan. At the time of the killing, Richmond lived on a nearby Hendricks County farm and was just passing through Martinsville on the night Jenkins was murdered.

Richmond's estranged daughter (of 24 years), Shirley, now married with the last name McQueen, corroborated the details of Carol's murder, including the clothing that Jenkins was wearing that night, which never had been revealed to the public. Detectives believed that the information given about the murder was accurate and they had found one of the killers. The police realized that they would not have found Shirley if it had not been for the anonymous phone call and letter. Both the call and the letter had been provided by 46-year-old Connie McQueen, Shirley McQueen's former sister-in-law. Shirley had confided in Connie about the murder, and Connie felt compelled to do something 15 years after being told about the murder by Shirley McQueen.

Shirley McQueen confirmed that, as a 7-year-old, she watched from the back seat of a car as her father, and another man—who had been riding around drinking together—killed Carol Jenkins. McQueen stated that, when her father and the unknown assailant got back into the car, Richmond laughed and said of Jenkins, "She got what she deserved." As they drove away, McQueen looked back and saw Jenkins fall next to a bush.

McQueen stated that, as they drove back home, Richmond gave her seven dollars—one dollar for each year of her life—to keep his daughter quiet about what she had witnessed.

Aftermath
Richmond never went to trial for Jenkins' murder, nor was his accomplice ever identified. He was declared incompetent to stand trial and, two weeks later, on August 31, 2002, he died of bladder cancer.

Following the murder, Don and Norma Neal received constant harassment and death threats after it was revealed that they tried to help Jenkins.

In 2014, the Neals proposed a monument in Martinsville in Carol's memory. However, the plans were scrapped after the county commissioner, Norman Voyles, said that he "started getting flack" about it.

A community park in Rushville, Indiana was rededicated in Jenkins' name (as Carol Jenkins-Davis Park) on November 1, 2017, and a memory stone was placed in the garden of Martinsville's city hall on November 2, 2017.

References

People from Rushville, Indiana
Racially motivated violence against African Americans
1968 murders in the United States
Murdered African-American people
Deaths by stabbing in Indiana
Hate crimes
People murdered in Indiana
1968 in Indiana
September 1968 events in the United States
Female murder victims
Morgan County, Indiana